Pujita Ponnada is an Indian actress who predominantly works in Telugu cinema. She is principally noted for her roles in the films Rangasthalam (2018) and Kalki (2019).

Early life 
Pujita Ponnada was born into a Telugu family in Visakhapatnam and raised in Chennai.

Career 
Pujita Ponnada worked as a software engineer in Tata Consultancy Services before she started her acting career with short films. She has appeared in Darsakudu and Miss India in prominent roles.

Filmography

All films are in Telugu, unless otherwise noted.

Feature films
{| class="wikitable sortable"
|+
|-
!Year
!Film
!Role
! Notes
|-
| 2016
|Oopiri
| Gallery manager || Debut film, Bilingual film 
|-
|2017
|Darsakudu
| Shailu ||
|-
| rowspan="4" |2018
|Rangasthalam
|Padma
|
|-
|Raju Gadu
|Vennela
|
|-
|Brand Babu
|Pavani
|
|-
|Happy Wedding
|Laveena
|
|-
| rowspan="3" |2019
|7
| Bhanu
| Bilingual film (Tamil, Telugu)
|-
|Kalki
|Palapitta
|
|-
|Where Is the Venkatalakshmi
|Gowri
|
|-
|-
| rowspan="2" |2020
|Run
| Shruti || Aha film
|-
|Miss India
|Padma Naina
| Netflix film
|-
|2021
|MoneyShe
|Madhu 
|SparkOTT release
|-
| rowspan="3" |2022
|Katha Kanchiki Manam Intiki
| Deeksha
|
|-
|Odela Railway Station
|Spoorthi
|
|-
|Aakasa Veedullo
|Nisha
|
|-
| rowspan="2" |2023 
| Ravanasura 
|
|Filming
|-
|Bhagavan|
|Tamil film; filming
|}

Short films
 Upma Tinesindi (2015)
 A Saturday Evening'' (2016)

References 

Living people
Actresses in Telugu cinema
21st-century Indian actresses
Female models from Andhra Pradesh
Actresses from Visakhapatnam
1990 births
Telugu actresses